Katherine Beaumont may refer to:
Kathryn Beaumont (born 1938), English actress
 Katherine Neville, Duchess of Norfolk ( 1400–1483), English noblewoman